CHRS-FM is a First Nations community radio station that broadcasts at 97.5 FM in Cumberland House, Saskatchewan, Canada.

CHRS-FM is owned by the Cumberland House Cree Nation.

External links
Cumberland House Cree Nation
 

Hrs
Cree culture